Jean Dupont may refer to:

 Jean Dupont (cyclist) (born 1938), French cyclist
 Jean Dupont (governor), governor of Martinique from 1635 to 1636
 Jean-Léonce Dupont (born 1955), French senator
 Jean-Louis Dupont (born 1965), Belgian lawyer
 Jean-Pierre Dupont (born 1933), French member of the National Assembly